The 1934 Philadelphia Eagles season was their second in the league. The team failed to improve on their previous output of 3–5–1, losing seven games. They failed to qualify for the playoffs for the second consecutive season. However, on an interesting note, all of Philadelphia's wins were shutouts. Not only that, but the team allowed 7.7 points per game (the best in franchise history). They allowed 6 points or less 5 times, and were 4–1 in those games.

Off Season 
The Eagles held their preseason training camp in the New Jersey resort city of Atlantic City, New Jersey.

Regular season

Schedule

Standings

Playoffs 
In their second year of existence the Eagles failed to play for the NFL Championship.

Roster 
(All time List of Philadelphia Eagles players in franchise history)

Being a 2nd year expansion team the Eagles were mostly stocked with Rookies and 1st or 2nd years players.
This was before the NFL Draft was started. All the NFL teams competed for the same players in an open market.

A List of the 1934 Philadelphia Eagles.

Postseason

Awards and honors 
 Tom "Swede" Hanson ties as NFL Leader in Rushing Attempts with 146 attempts
 Tom Hanson finishes 2nd in yards rushing with 805 yards.
 Joe Carter ties for league lead with 16 receptions, and Receiving yards with 14.9 yards/catch.
 Joe Carter finished 2nd in 4 Receiving TDs
 Ed Matesic ties for league lead in Interception TD Returns with 1
 Al Weiner finished the season with only 1 FG with. The leader Jack Manders had 10, and 5 finished second with 4 each.

References 

Philadelphia Eagles seasons
Philadelphia Eagles
Philadelphia Eag